Vetere may refer to:

People
Jeff Vetere (born 1966), English football executive
Richard Vetere (born 1952), American playwright

Places
Cuccaro Vetere, town in Italy
Magliano Vetere, town in Italy
Ostra Vetere, town in Italy
Santa Maria Capua Vetere, town in Italy